Y Prifardd, literally The Chief Bard, is the Welsh title given to bards who have won either the chair or the crown in the National Eisteddfod of Wales. It is a very highly respected title in the Welsh language community, due to an acknowledgement of the artistic talent required to acquire it. 
Prifardd is used both as a common noun ("he is a prifardd") and as an honorific that precedes the title-holder's name in the way that 'The Reverend' or 'The Honourable' would be used in English; for example, "Y Prifardd Christine James".

For lists of chaired and crowned bards, see Chaired Bards (category) and Crowned Bards (category).

References

Eisteddfod
Titles
Welsh poetry